Admiral Clark may refer to:

Charles Edgar Clark (1843–1922), U.S. Navy rear admiral
George Ramsey Clark (1857–1945), U.S. Navy rear admiral
Joseph J. Clark (1893–1971), U.S. Navy admiral
Vern Clark (born 1944), U.S. Navy admiral

See also
Philip Clarke (Royal Navy officer) (1898–1966), British Royal Navy rear admiral